Blidworth Bottoms is a hamlet in Nottinghamshire, England. It is located between Blidworth and Ravenshead. Population details are included in the civil parish of Blidworth. The hamlet consists of Bottoms Farm, the Fox and Hounds public house and a small number of houses.  In the 19th century a barn was converted into a Primitive Methodist chapel. Well attended in the 1860s, it had fallen into decline by the 1900s.

References

Hamlets in Nottinghamshire
Blidworth